This article refers to one of the former prefectures of Chad. From 2002 the country was divided into 18 regions.

Moyen-Chari was one of the 14 prefectures of Chad. Located in the south of the country, Moyen-Chari covered an area of 45,180 square kilometers and had a population of 738,595 in 1993. Its capital was Sarh.

See also 
2006 Zakouma elephant slaughter

References 

Prefectures of Chad